Hong Lei may refer to:

 Hong Lei (artist) (born 1960)
 Hong Lei (diplomat) (born 1969)